HMS Dove was a three funnel, 30 knot destroyer ordered by the Royal Navy under the 1896–1897 Naval Estimates. She was the ninth ship to carry the name.

Construction
HMS Dove was one of two "thirty-knotter" torpedo boat destroyers ordered by the British Admiralty from the Kingston upon Hull shipyard of Earle's Shipbuilding and Engineering Company as part of the 1896–1897 shipbuilding programme for the Royal Navy, out of a total of 20 destroyers ordered from various builders as part of this programme, consisting of 17 "thirty-knotters" contracted to reach a speed of  during sea trials and three builders specials contracted to give higher speeds. As with other early Royal Navy destroyers, the design of Dove was left to the builder, with the Admiralty laying down only broad requirements (although all designs were approved by the Admiralty), rather than the Admiralty ordering ships to a standard design.

The boilers' outtakes were routed to three flat-sided funnels. The ship had the standard armament of the Thirty-Knotters, i.e. a QF 12 pounder 12 cwt ( calibre) gun on a platform on the ship's conning tower (in practice the platform was also used as the ship's bridge), with a secondary armament of five 6-pounder guns, and two 18-inch (450 mm) torpedo tubes. The ship was manned by 63 officers and men.

The ship was laid down on 17 September 1896, at Earle's Shipbuilding and Engineering Company Limited shipyard at Hull, Yorkshire, Construction was delayed by industrial action and Dove was not launched until 21 March 1898. Although she was claimed to have reached  during builder's tests, official trials were less successful, and like her sister ship , she failed to reach contract speed, Dove only reaching . Problems with getting these destroyers through their acceptance trials resulted in financial problems for Earle's which resulted in the company's bankruptcy. Dove was completed and accepted by the Royal Navy in July 1901.

Service history

Pre-War
After commissioning Dove was assigned to the Channel Fleet, taking part in the 1901 Naval Manoeuvres. Commander Douglas Nicholson was appointed in command on 24 February 1902, and Dove was assigned to the Portsmouth instructional flotilla. In May 1902 the ship struck a rock off Kildorney, and had to be towed by her sister ship Bullfinch to Queenstown. She was deemed fit for sea, and the following day was towed by the service vessel  to her home-port Portsmouth, where she was docked for repairs. In 1910, Dove formed part of the 5th Destroyer Flotilla at Devonport.

On 30 August 1912 the Admiralty directed all destroyers were to be grouped into classes designated by letters based on contract speed and appearance. As a three-funneled destroyer with a contract speed of 30 knots, Dove was assigned to the C class. The class letters were painted on the hull below the bridge area and on a funnel. In 1912, it was decided to allocate older destroyers to dedicated Patrol Flotillas, with Dove being allocated to the Seventh Flotilla, based at Devonport.

World War I
In July 1914 Dove was in active commission in the 7th Destroyer Flotilla based at Devonport tendered to the destroyer depot ship . In November 1914 Dove was one of 29 destroyers transferred to Scapa Flow for local patrols around the base of the Grand Fleet. By March, Dove had transferred to the North Channel Patrol Flotilla, based at Larne in the north of Ireland.

On 24 April 1916, the Easter Rising against British rule broke out in Ireland. As a response, two Infantry Brigades were ordered from Liverpool to Dublin to reinforce the British forces, with Dove taking part in escorting the transports carrying these troops. By November 1918 she had been redeployed to the Devonport Local Flotilla based out of Liverpool.

In 1919 Dove was paid off and laid-up in reserve awaiting disposal.  She was sold on 27 January 1920 to Maden and McKee of Porthcawl for breaking.

Pennant numbers

References

Bibliography
 
 
 
 
 
 
 
 
 
 

 

Ships built on the Humber
1898 ships
C-class destroyers (1913)
World War I destroyers of the United Kingdom